Terri White is a British journalist, editor and author. She was the editor-in-chief of Empire magazine.

Career 
Around 2001, White served as a features assistant at Woman & Home magazine. She was the associate editor of Nuts, before moving roles to work as deputy news editor at Maxim in 2006. In 2007, White started working at ShortList magazine as an editor, then she was promoted as Editor in Chief in 2010 before moving to Buzz magazine as an editor the following year. In 2014, joined Time Out New York as editor-in-chief. White was announced as editor-in-chief of Empire magazine in September 2015 replacing Morgan Rees who had held the position since October 2014.

She is a fellow of The Royal Society for Arts, Manufactures and Commerce.

White's memoir, Coming Undone, is currently in development for Netflix. The show will be developed by White and produced by Bad Wolf, with Billie Piper set to star.

Awards 
In 2010, White won the "new editor" category of two publishers association awards: the UK Professional Publishers Association and the British Society of Magazine Editors.

Selected works
 Coming Undone (2020, Canongate Books)

References 

Living people
21st-century English writers
20th-century English women writers
20th-century English writers
21st-century English women writers
English newspaper editors
Year of birth missing (living people)
English magazine editors